Events in the year 2017 in Peru.

Incumbents
 President: Pedro Pablo Kuczynski
 First Vice President: Martín Vizcarra
 Second Vice President: Mercedes Aráoz
 Prime Minister: Fernando Zavala Lombardi (until September 17), Mercedes Aráoz (starting September 17)

Events 
 The 2017 Peru flood was a natural disaster in Peru in which more than 100 000 homes were demolished, over 100 bridges washed out, and multiple roadways rendered inoperable.  Over 70 people have lost their lives as a result of the flooding.

Publications 
 Francisco Sagasti and Lucía Málaga Sabogal's book Un desafío persistente. Políticas de ciencia, tecnología e innovación en el Perú del siglo 21.

Cinema 
 La última tarde (The last evening) by Joel Calero.

Deaths

January 
20 January – José Luis Astigarraga Lizarralde, Roman Catholic bishop (b. 1940).

March 
27 March – Armando Nieto, Roman Catholic priest and historian (b. 1931).

April 
11 April – José Ramón Gurruchaga Ezama, Roman Catholic prelate, Bishop of Huaraz and Lurin (b. 1931).
23 April – Luis Pércovich Roca, politician, Prime Minister 1984–1985 (b. 1931).

June 
14 June – Luis Abanto Morales, singer and composer (b. 1923)

July 
14 July – Pedro Richter Prada, politician, Prime Minister 1979–1980 (b. 1921).
20 July – Wilindoro Cacique, 75, Amazonian cumbia musician (Juaneco y Su Combo).

August 
21 August – Arturo Corcuera, poet (b. 1935).
28 August – Angélica Mendoza de Ascarza, human rights activist (b. 1929).

September 
13 September – Saby Kamalich, film and television actress (b. 1939).
24 September – Carlos Vidal Layseca, physician, Minister of Health and Rector of Cayetano Heredia University (b. 1931).

October 
9 October – Fernando de Szyszlo, painter, sculptor and printmaker (b. 1925).
19 October – Miguel Ángel Loayza, football player (b. 1940).

References

 
2010s in Peru
Years of the 21st century in Peru
Peru
Peru